Echinocereus arizonicus  is a species of cactus native to the Chihuahuan Desert region of Chihuahua, southwestern New Mexico and southeastern Arizona, as well as in the Superstition and Mescal Mountains of Central Arizona. An endangered variable of the species "Echinocereus triglochidiatus arizonicus" is found exclusively in sections of the Superstition, Mescal, and Pinal Mountains. Genetic studies have indicated that this variable of the species does not occur outside these mountain ranges.

Common names include "Arizona claret-cup cactus" and "Arizona hedgehog cactus."

Echinocereus arizonicus has deep red to bright orange-red flowers, sometimes with a lighter yellowish-green center.

References

External links

arizonicus
Cacti of Mexico
Cacti of the United States
Flora of the Chihuahuan Desert
Flora of Arizona
Flora of Chihuahua (state)
Flora of New Mexico
Plants described in 1926